This page outlines the history and evolution of Victorian Railways (Australia) bogie passenger carriages, constructed with steel underframes and timber bodies up to  long, as well as a few other carriages from the era.

A total of 640 locomotive-hauled, wooden-bodied, bogie carriages were constructed between 1874 and 1903, mostly to variants of the basic design. All were fitted with buffers or, later, buffing plates, and all couplings were of the screw type.

In March 1903, the Victorian government announced that a Canadian, Thomas Tait, had been appointed as the new Chairman of Commissioners of the Victorian Railways. He immediately set out to introduce a new type of passenger carriage, inspired by the latest trends overseas. They would later be designated E type carriages, with the first being put into service in late 1906.

Liveries
All carriages began with the then-standard dark maroon livery over a black underframe, with yellow pin-striping and details. During and after World War I, the detailing was abolished and they were painted plain red, with white text on black rectangles for running information, such as class and identity.

1954 saw a change to a much brighter red livery. Not many cars survived to the 1972 change of class designation from from "Second" to "Economy".

The first bogie carriage

The oldest wooden bogie passenger carriage owned by the Victorian Railways had been purchased from the Melbourne and Hobsons Bay United Railway Company as that company's carriage no.21. After purchase, it retained its number, with a note attached indicating that it was part of the South Suburban system. In 1879, it was re-classed 1AA and, in 1888, it was changed again to 11BB. The 1910 recoding saw it relabelled 11B. In 1940, the car was withdrawn from regular service and converted to workmen's sleeper 9WW. It was scrapped in 1957.

The body had two doors on either side for two compartments, each seating 26. The seats were installed against the walls, making for a sort of lounge arrangement.

American Saloon cars
When the Victorian Railways first started looking into bogie passenger carriage design, Britain didn't have many examples to follow, so the styles selected were copied from American railroads of the era.

Between 1874 and 1892, a total of 27 American saloon-style carriages were constructed, all bar two to a standard design.

Standard design

Special cars

44ft 6in car "Albert"

The car was built at the Phoenix Foundry in Ballarat, and entered service in 1887 as 3AA. It was originally the prized car of Solomon Mirls, the chief mechanical engineer of the Victorian Railways from 1878 to 1890. The car was slightly longer than the standard American saloon types then entering service, and the saloon was accessed from end platforms or by a centrally located door. The car was laid out with a centre aisle having two-seater benches either side, all facing towards the centre of the carriage, with a capacity of 48 first-class passengers. Each saloon had five benches on either side of the central aisle, with a further two opposite the lavatories behind each saloon section. The lavatory compartments did not have running water, and were placed diagonally opposite each other.

In 1894, the car was rebuilt. The two lavatory compartments were plumbed, and marked "W.C." on the construction diagram. All seats were removed from the men's end of the carriage, including the saloon, and the saloon was refitted with a central table, two long benches, and a small buffet counter. The car was renamed "Albert" in June 1896.

On 27 June 1902, the car returned to regular service as 129AA (the second vehicle to have that identity), and may have been restored to its original configuration. The function of the car was later taken over by State Cars 1, 2 and 3. On 18 May 1903, the car was further modified with one saloon reallocated to second class passengers, and the code changed to 83ABAB.

The car was modified again in 1908, becoming 5ABDABD. At that stage, it was fitted with a guard's compartment, and may have been used for ticket sales on minor branch lines. Aside from being re-classified to 5ABC in 1910, the car ran in that form until 1941. It was condemned and removed from the rollingstock register on 9 April 1941, then scrapped.

45ft car "Victoria"

The carriage entered service on 1 March 1887, and was the first one built for the Victorian Railways with a -long body. It was classified 19A but, within a year, that had changed to AA, to reflect that it was a bogie vehicle as distinct from the non-bogie fleet. The car was always intended for special use, rather than being an addition to the regular passenger rolling stock, and the original documentation refers to the car as the "New Departmental Victoria". It seems likely that the car was always intended to be known as "Victoria", even though that name was not applied to the carriage sides until 1894. At the same time, Knowles ventilators were fitted.

The car was fitted with the Westinghouse brake from new, and was designed to be a self-sufficient vehicle. It had a  platform either side of the body for access, and inward-swinging doors to access the saloons. The next four windows either side were for the guard's compartment, which included an elevated seat for the guard to view signals through cupola windows, as well as an ice chest and small buffet counter facing the long saloon. On one side, an extra-length window was provided for the guard's paperwork desk, and the next window was for a  toilet compartment. Opposite them, two window-lengths were used for a larger, lavatory compartment. They were either side of a central corridor, which linked to a  four-windowed saloon, fitted with eight seats, which led to the open platform.

By 1925, the car had been modified for use in the Better Farming Train, a special marketing service devised by Harold Clapp, the Victorian Railways' Chief Commissioner at the time. Being part of a full train consist, the guard facilities were no longer required, so they were removed and the entire compartment was converted to a larger kitchen area. The corridor connecting the two saloons was partitioned, additional cooking benches were provided, and the ice chests were moved. The guard's seat was also removed and a stove was fitted in its place. The saloons were left mostly untouched, but some of the loose chairs had been moved.

In 1943, the car was withdrawn from special service and converted to a Way and Works vehicle, for use by railway workmen around the state. In that form, it was given the identity of 11WW, officially applied from 19 November 1943. The car continued in that service until 1954, when it was removed from the railway register and marked for scrap. However, in 1955, the body was noted in use as part of a scout hall in Trugannini Road, Caulfield, south of Carnegie railway station. It was still there through the early 1970s, but vanished after that until spotted again in the 1990s behind Mimosa Road, Caulfield, painted white and with a protective roof. In 2009, the car body was under shelter in Newport Workshops, having been moved there circa 2005.

End platform cars

39ft 1in saloon (?) cars

64ft side-corridor sleeping cars

"Enterprise" and "Perseverance"
In 1890, two carriages were built to introduce a sleeping car service to Portland. "Enterprise" first ran during February 1890 and "Perseverance" first ran on 5 June of the same year.

The earlier cars had eight compartments for 20 passengers (six twinettes and two quadrettes), but the Portland cars had room for 24 passengers over eight compartments, as four twinettes and four quadrettes. They were organised with a single Ladies' twinette at one end, then two quadrettes, two twinettes, two quadrettes and a single smoking twinette at the far end. The Ladies' compartment, and the two central twinette compartments, were divided from the corridor by doors, whereas the other five compartments only had a curtain. Additionally, the two centre twinette compartments had a connecting door, so they could form a single, larger quadrette compartment if the need arose.

It is possible that the height of the car changed with different bogie types or mounting methods, or the roof ventilators might have been changed.

The sleeper service to Portland was cancelled by 1900, so the cars became surplus to regular requirements. Both were extensively rebuilt and found new niche roles.

State Car 1
To create State Car 1, "Enterprise" was largely gutted, and two large saloons were created in the centre of the carriage. The Gentlemen's Saloon measured  and was provided with a table, three couches and six rounded plush seats. The Ladies' Saloon had four couches and four square plush seats, with a much smaller square table placed centrally. The outer two twinette compartments were retained, with buffet attendants' sitting and sleeping facilities provided adjacent to the Gentlemen's Saloon, and a Ladies Attendants' saloon provided at the opposite end. The end platforms were retained for access, and the bathrooms were generally unchanged. The car was renamed State Car No.1, to distinguish from the then-planned State Cars 2 and 3. Given that the latter two were originally referred to as Royal Cars during the planning stages, it seems likely that the same was applied to "Enterprise" during its rebuild. In August 1936, the car was fitted with automatic couplers, but it could be fitted with transition hooks if required. It was used until 1950, when State Car No.5 was built, rendering most of the other State Cars obsolete. By 1953, State Car No.1 had been scrapped, with the underframe transferred to "Norman".

Inspection Car/Norman
"Perseverance" was rebuilt as the "Inspection Car" for the use of the Victorian Railways' Commissioner (at the time there was only one), accommodating 28 staff members. Like "Enterprise", it was entirely cleared out, but also underwent some structural changes. The window arrangement was changed, with many paired windows joined into a single frame to give a better view for railway staff. Although it is not clear, it is assumed that, as with "Enterprise", the diagram was flipped when transcribed to the 1904 rolling stock book, and the corridor shown at the bottom of the image is the same as that previously shown at the top. With that in mind, from the former smoking end, the layout changed from 1, 1, 2, 3, 3, 2, 2, 3, 3, 2, 1, 1 to 1(1+1), 1(2), 1(3), 1, 1 (former 3), 2, 2, 3, 1+2(3), 1(2), 1(1+1). The interior of the former smoking end was replaced with a 10-seat saloon area, the centre of the carriage was replaced with a kitchen and lavatory, and the former ladies' end of the car was fitted with a  saloon with six chairs, four couches and an extending table, for a total capacity of 18. No formal sleeping facility was provided, though the couch pairs could have been used as beds. The car was renamed "Norman" on 20 January 1921, after the former Chairman of Commissioners, C. E. Norman, and around the same time, extra chairs were added, raising capacity to 30.

In 1953, the underframe of "Norman" was replaced with that formerly under State Car No.1. That meant the car became representative of all five variants of the ex-Portland sleeping car designs, with parts from both mixed together. The car was withdrawn in 1963, allowing the "Norman" name to be transferred to the former Parlor car. The original car was taken to the Newport Railway Museum, and was placed on a historic register on 13 July 1983. Shortly after the car entered the museum, its worn seating was removed and replaced with bench seats previously used in carriage 13AE.

65ft 2in side-corridor cars "Pioneer" 1st/2nd, later 12BL/13BL, "Enterprise"/"Pioneer"

"Pioneer" 1st and 2nd were built in 1893 for use on the Bendigo line. The cars operated as a pair, one for first-class passengers (eight compartments, including two smoking and two ladies, seating 64) and the other for second-class passengers (nine compartments, including two smoking and two ladies, seating 72). However, a premium was charged for travel in either car. Both had been fitted with two lavatories by 1895. In 1921, the two carriages were converted to 12BL and 13BL.

During World War II, 13BL was used in an ambulance train as a staff carriage. It is thought that 12BL was stored during that time.

Both cars were used as accommodation on the Wirth's Circus Train in the 1950s. The circus staff complained about the poor condition of the carriages, which, by that stage, were over 60 years old.

In 1962, the pair were withdrawn from the circus train and, in 1968, they were returned to service in the consist of the "Vintage Train", being renamed "Enterprise" and "Pioneer" respectively. The name "Enterprise" had last been used on the carriage later known as State Car No.1. Both were placed on the Victorian Historic Vehicles Register in July 1983.

Fully-enclosed compartment cars (45ft type)

The typical carriage had a set of individual compartments seating ten passengers. The main difference between classes was the width of compartments, with exclusively first-class carriages fitted with six compartments, composite (first and second-class) carriages typically with three first class compartments flanked by two second class compartments either side, and exclusively second-class carriages fitted with eight compartments. Compartments contained two bench seats, with a central footway connecting to outward-swinging doors either side, which could be locked with a standard square carriage key.

1887:
 ADAD 1-6

1888:
 AA 15-17, 20, 25-54 & 85-98 
 ABAB 4 & 7
 ADAD 7-12

1889:
 AA 18, 55-84, 99-137, 148, 150, 158, 161, 167, 170, 191-192, 194-195, 197-200, 202, 208 & 221

1890:
 AA 21-24, 138-147, 149, 151-157, 159-160, 162-166, 168-169, 171-175, 185-190, 193/York, 196, 235-237 & 259-262
 BEBE 2
 O 26 & 27
 ADAD 13-14 & 16-33
 BEBE 1

1891:
 AA 176-180, 201, 203-207, 209-220, 222-234, 238-250 & 263-274
 O 28
 ADAD 34-62

1892:
 AA 251-258 & 275-284
 ABAB 5 & 6
 BB 12-19

1893:
 ABAB 21 & 22

1897:
 ADAD 63-68

1898:
 ADAD 69-74

1902:
 AA 1-6

Governor's Car / York

193AA was built by Ellis and entered service on 3 November 1890, as just one of the range of first class fully enclosed bogie carriages. The car had seven identical  compartments, each with three windows - two in line with the bench seats, and one in the outward-swinging door. Full-height partitions separated the compartments, placed behind every third window.

In 1894 the car was returned to the workshops and rebuilt for special service. When it re-entered service it had been completely cleared out, and most of the external doors were sealed. The new car was called the Governor's Car (State), and featured a ladies lavatory and water closet at one end (windows 1 & 2), then two saloons with lounge chairs and tables (windows 3 to 9 and 10 to 17), a gentlemen's lavatory and water closet with a side corridor (windows 18 and 19), then a small buffet counter at the far end (windows 20 and 21). Most of the external doors were sealed, leaving one each side per saloon, and three for accessing the buffet area at the gentlemen's end.

In April 1901 the car was renamed York, and the fittings in the two saloons were cleared out and replaced with  x  tables and assorted plush chairs for a total capacity of 22 passengers. The car was fitted with a handbrake in 1907.

On 11 June 1919 the car was modified and returned to regular 1st class passenger service, as 4A. On 31 December 1927 it was reclassified as a second-class vehicle 145B at Jolimont Workshops, then in 1958 it was converted to workmen's sleeper 78WW. A few months later it was renumbered 67WW.

Rebuilds / extensions

Fully enclosed compartment cars with corridor (AC, ABC, AL, BL, ABL type)

Corridor cars AC, later AL, BL, 59ABL (45' 0")
1-12AC converted ex AA swing-door cars in 1902, by adding corridors through one side of the carriage, reducing the size of all six compartments. Each compartment was given a new face into the corridor, but the external doors on both sides were retained. The reduced compartment sizes changed capacity from 60 seats to only 34.

10AC was destroyed in 1906 at Kirkstall.

Recoded 1AL-10AL (ex 1-9, 11), 59ABL (ex 12) in 1910, then 1-10BL in 1913 and 11BL in 1918.

Corridor cars ABC, later ABL (50' 2")
The initial build was of 58 ABC carriages, 50ft2in over body but with an internal corridor along one side, as opposed to the then-standard individual compartment design. The cars were released to service over the period 1899-1903, numbered 1 through 58. Most of the cars had capacity for 16 1st and 32 2nd class passengers, though numbers 40, 48 and 53-58 had a different interior with room for 18 1st and 28 2nd class passengers. Unlike most rollingstock, the ABC/ABL cars had a vertical white line painted on both sides of the carriage, showing the gap between 1st and 2nd class accommodation.

In 1910 the carriages were reclassed ABL.

59ABL was converted from 12AC in 1910, but converted to 11BL in 1918. During its time as an ABL it was shorter, with less capacity, than the rest of the class.

Cars ABL 3, 5, 10, 31 were converted to workmen's sleeper cars in the early 1960s, taking numbers 85-88WW. All other cars were withdrawn between 1959 and 1968, and 29ABL was the last to be scrapped in 1973 (though it had been withdrawn in 1962).

Fully enclosed cars (50'2" type)

Rebuilds / extensions

V type carriages

E type carriages

W & U type carriages

Long W type carriages

Special Consists

The Better Farming Train

The RESO Train

The Vintage Train

The Wirth's Circus Train

Disposal and Preservation
The vast majority of carriages listed on this page were destroyed and burnt as a quick, easy form of disposal. Some were sold as sheds or a cheap form of housing, and a handful were retained for preservation.

The current known remnants are:
 3ABL was recovered as 85WW and is held at Moorooduc.
 45ABL was retained for preservation and is currently awaiting restoration at Steamrail Ballarat.

Model Railways

References

Victorian Railways carriages